The Paseo YMCA is a U.S. historic YMCA in Kansas City, Missouri.

History

The Paseo YMCA opened in 1914, when Julius Rosenwald encouraged Kansas Citians to raise $80,000 toward building a new YMCA. In 1920 eight independent black baseball team owners met to form what would become the Negro National League.
Later, in the 1970s, it closed.

Museum renovations
In 2006, an effort was headed by the Negro Leagues Baseball Museum to renovate the museum, called "Thanks a Million Buck". The goal to raise a million dollars was quickly reached when John "Buck" O'Neil died in October 2006. 
 
The YMCA is scheduled to reopen as an extension of the Negro Leagues Baseball Museum in 2007 and the Buck O'Neil Education Research Center.

The architect of the Paseo YMCA was local architect Charles A. Smith.

References

Buildings and structures in Kansas City, Missouri
YMCA buildings in the United States
Clubhouses on the National Register of Historic Places in Missouri
Clubhouses in Missouri
National Register of Historic Places in Kansas City, Missouri